Eduardo Furusho (born 6 July 1968) is a Brazilian former professional tennis player of Japanese descent. He is also known as Daijiro Furusho.

Born in São Paulo, Furusho began playing tennis at the age of nine and turned professional in 1987.

Furusho, a left-handed player, made the second round of the 1988 Athens Open but made most of his Grand Prix/ATP Tour main draw appearances as a doubles player.

In the 1990s he switched his nationality and played in three Davis Cup ties for Japan, under the name Daijiro Furusho.

Challenger titles

Doubles: (1)

See also
List of Japan Davis Cup team representatives

References

External links
 
 
 

1968 births
Living people
Brazilian male tennis players
Japanese male tennis players
Tennis players from São Paulo
Brazilian people of Japanese descent